This article lists terrorist incidents in Iraq during 2016:

January 
January 11 - At least 50 people were killed in a spate of attacks in Baghdad. ISIS claimed responsibility.
January 27 - 2016 Ramadi bombing: Up to a dozen car bombs were set off in the city of Ramadi. The blast killed 55 Iraqi soldiers and pro-government tribal fighters

February 
February 4 - At least 28 killed in attacks in Ramadi and Fallujah.
February 8 - 2016 Mosul massacre
February 28 - February 2016 Baghdad bombings
February 29 - 38 killed at a Shia funeral in Muqdadiya.

March 
March 6 -  A suicide bomber kills at least 60 people and wounds 70 others after ramming his explosives-laden truck into a security checkpoint at one of entrances to the Iraqi city of Hillah, south of Baghdad.
March 25 -  Iskandariya suicide bombing - 29 killed in a bombing of a football stadium south of Badghdad.
March 29 - At least 3 people die and another 27 were injured in a suicide bombing attack in Baghdad. The Islamic State of Iraq and the Levant claimed responsibility for the attack.

April 
April 4 - A suicide bomber blew himself up on a street killing five people and wounding five others in the southern city of Basra.
April 4 - A suicide bomber blew himself up inside a restaurant that is frequented by Shiite paramilitary militia fighters, killing at least 14 people.
April 4 - Earlier in the day, a suicide bomber rammed his car into a security checkpoint in the capital's northeastern suburb of Sadr al-Qanat, killing six troops and wounding 13 others.
April 4 - Another suicide car bomber hit a headquarters of paramilitary troops in the town of Mishahda, 20 miles (30 kilometers) north of Baghdad, killing four troops and wounding 10 others.
April 9 - A bomb killed one and 3 people were injured in Diyala Province
April 9 - In Sabaa al-Bour a bomb killed at least 2 people and another 8 were injured.

May 
May 1 - At least 33 people died in a bombing in Samawa.
May 11 - At least 62 people died in a truck bombing in Bagdad.
May 13 - Real Madrid fan club massacres.
May 15 - 2016 Iraq Gas Plant attack.
May 17 - May 2016 Baghdad bombings.

June 
June 4 - Bombings in and around Baghdad kill 15.

July 
July 2 - Karrada bombings kill at least 308 people.
July 24 - Kadhimiya Baghdad bombing kills at least 21 people.

November 
November 24 - A truck bomb attack in Hillah killed at least 100 people.

See also 
List of terrorist incidents, 2016
Terrorist incidents in Iraq in 2015
Terrorist incidents in Iraq in 2014
Terrorist incidents in Iraq in 2013
List of bombings during the Iraq War

References 

 
2016 in Iraq
2016
Lists of terrorist incidents in 2016